Tibor Nagy (born 14 August 1991) is a Hungarian football player who plays for Monor.

Club statistics

Updated to games played as of 7 February 2022.

References

External links
Profile at HLSZ 

1991 births
Living people
People from Nyíregyháza
Hungarian footballers
Hungary youth international footballers
Association football defenders
MTK Budapest FC players
Szigetszentmiklósi TK footballers
Újpest FC players
Diósgyőri VTK players
III. Kerületi TUE footballers
Monori SE players
Nemzeti Bajnokság I players
Nemzeti Bajnokság II players
Sportspeople from Szabolcs-Szatmár-Bereg County